Tibor Rab (born 2 October 1955) is a Hungarian former footballer who played at both professional and international levels as a defender.

Career
Born in Gödöllő, Rab played club football for Ferencváros and Monori SE.

He also earned 20 caps for the Hungarian national team between 1975 and 1982, representing them at the 1982 FIFA World Cup. He was also part of the Hungary squad for the 1978 FIFA World Cup, but did not play in the tournament.

References

1955 births
Living people
Hungarian footballers
Hungary international footballers
Ferencvárosi TC footballers
Monori SE players
Nemzeti Bajnokság I players
1978 FIFA World Cup players
1982 FIFA World Cup players
People from Gödöllő
Association football defenders
Sportspeople from Pest County